The New Zealand Broadcasting Corporation (NZBC) was a publicly owned company of the New Zealand Government founded in 1962. The Broadcasting Act 1976 then reformed NZBC as the Broadcasting Corporation of New Zealand (BCNZ). The corporation was dissolved on 1 April 1975, and replaced by three separate organisations: Radio New Zealand, Television One, and Television Two, later known as South Pacific Television. The television channels would merge again in 1980 to become Television New Zealand, while Radio New Zealand remained unchanged.

History
At 7:30pm on 1 June 1960, New Zealand's first television channel, AKTV2, started broadcasting in Auckland from the NZBC building at 74 Shortland Street, previously used to broadcast public radio station 1YA and now home to The University of Auckland's Gus Fisher Gallery. Owned and operated by the New Zealand Broadcasting Service. With the passing of the Broadcasting Corporation Act 1961, the New Zealand Broadcasting Corporation was established, with F. J. Llewellyn as its chairman. During the course of the Bill through the House of Representatives in the session of 1961, provision was made for the establishment of privately owned stations and, although strongly opposed by the Labour Opposition, this became part of the Act. But before such stations could be established, the corporation, which took office on 1 April 1962, was required to undertake a review of existing coverage. At the time of transfer, the Corporation assumed responsibility for the control of 35 radio stations and four television stations. The number of licence holders for sound radio grew to more than 600,000. The tremendous appeal of television was demonstrated by the fact that in the first three-year period of development the number of licence holders reached a total of 275,000 (November 1964). The annual income from all sources exceeded NZ£5,000,000, more than NZ£250,000 being paid in taxation. Initially, the four television facilities were unlinked, and programming had to be shipped between each station. However, for urgent news video, it was possible to link the two stations in each island using Post Office Telephone Department (now Chorus) coaxial toll lines at the expense of a number of voice channels. This method was too costly for the regular programming.

The most notable example of the unlinked facilities was when the inter-island ferry  sank in Wellington Harbour on 10 April 1968 – newscasts of the disaster had to be transmitted over Post Office lines by WNTV1 to AKTV2 in Auckland. However, due to the storm disrupting both shipping and flights for a further 24 hours, the first video of the sinking crossed Cook Strait via regular transmissions from WNTV1 and was received on a privately owned television set in Blenheim, at the top of the South Island some 80 km line-of-sight distance from Wellington. A Blenheim-based news reporter's film camera was pointed at the television, then the exposed film was rushed by road to Christchurch, developed and transmitted over CHTV3, concurrently sent further south to DNTV2 for transmission there via a coax cable link. This Blenheim film appears to be the only surviving footage of the first day, and it shows part of the television set that the camera was pointed at. 

By the time of the Apollo 11 mission in July 1969, the two islands were each network-capable via microwave link, but the link over Cook Strait had not been completed, and there was no link between New Zealand and the outside world. Footage of the moon landing was recorded on video tape at the Australian Broadcasting Commission's ABN-2 in Sydney, then rushed by an RNZAF English Electric Canberra to Wellington and WNTV1. To forward this to the South Island, the NZBC positioned one of its first outside broadcasting vans to beam the footage to a receiving dish across Cook Strait, from which it was forwarded through the recently commissioned South Island network. The link was completed later that year, the first NZBC Network News transmitted on 3 November, read by Dougal Stevenson.

The NZBC's microwave network between facilities was very much ad hoc. Due to a shortage of microwave links, the network was completed by "off air" hops, where a 100 kW regional transmitter was received and re-transmitted by another. The network news was made possible by switching inputs to the regional transmitters, so that a signal could be relayed across the country. For instance, the Te Aroha regional transmitter for Hamilton could be switched away from Auckland programming to relay off-air, the Wellington signal coming up the country. Auckland then could see Wellington via Te Aroha. The non-synchronous switching was done manually initially and later with tone switching. During the network news presented from Wellington, if an inject was required from Auckland, Auckland would switch from transmitting Wellington pictures to transmitting, briefly a black screen with a small white "A" in the corner. Then each transmitter down the country would have to switch over so that the "A" would eventually appear in Wellington and beyond. Once all centres could see the "A" caption, the Auckland inject would be played. At the end of the item, the process would be reversed with a "W" for Wellington being switched sequentially, and then finally the Wellington presenter would appear again in all centres. The viewer would see a black non-synchronous switch which would take a second or so. Eagle-eyed viewers could see the identification letters change on the corner of the screen. Those with poor vertical hold would have to wait a little longer for the picture to stabilise. Occasionally, a transmitter would be switched out of sequence and the viewers would be treated to the sight of 100 kW of video feedback.

With the establishment of the Warkworth satellite station in 1971, New Zealand could finally communicate with the rest of the world. The first live broadcast received by satellite was the 1971 Melbourne Cup on 2 November.

For the first 13 years, NZBC TV broadcast solely in black and white. Colour television, using the phase alternating line (PAL) system, was introduced on 31 October 1973, in preparation for the 1974 British Commonwealth Games, held in Christchurch the following February. Due to the lack of colour facilities, only four of the ten sports (swimming, diving, athletics and boxing) could be broadcast in colour.

Reorganisation and breakup
The introduction of a second TV channel in 1975 also saw the reorganisation of broadcasting in New Zealand. On 1 April 1975, the NZBC was split into 3 separate state owned corporations: Television One, Television Two and Radio New Zealand.

The existing NZBC television service became TV One, and was based in Avalon Television Centre in Lower Hutt which officially opened on 17 March 1975. TV One, which began transmission on 1 April 1975, used the WNTV1 and DNTV2 studios and the existing channel frequencies, while AKTV2's Shortland Street studios and CHTV3 studios and new channel frequencies were used for the new TV2, which commenced later that year on 30th June.

TVNZ

In 1980, TV One and South Pacific (known once again as TV2) were merged into a single organisation, Television New Zealand (TVNZ).

See also
Television in New Zealand

References

Defunct companies of New Zealand
Former government agencies of New Zealand
Telecommunications in New Zealand
Television channels and stations established in 1960
Television channels and stations disestablished in 1975
Defunct radio stations in New Zealand
Defunct television channels in New Zealand
New Zealand companies established in 1960
Radio stations established in 1960 
Radio stations disestablished in 1975